Baie des Trépassés, or the Bay of the Dead, is a bay on Cap Sizun on the west coast of Finistère, in Brittany, France.  The bay is located between Pointe du Raz and Pointe du Van, on the territory of the commune of Plogoff.

The bay has a wide sandy beach, and is a popular surfing location.

There are legends (possibly derived from the name) that dead druids were ferried from here to be buried on the island of Sein.

See also
Trepassey Bay

References 

Landforms of Finistère
Trepasses
Surfing locations in France
Landforms of Brittany
Sports venues in Finistère